Hipparchia is a genus of butterflies within the family Nymphalidae. The genus was erected by Johan Christian Fabricius in 1807.

Species
Hipparchia alcyone (Denis and Schiffermüller, 1775) – rock grayling
Hipparchia alcyone caroli (Rothschild, 1933) (Morocco) may be a full species Hipparchia ellena caroli
Hipparchia alcyone genava may be a full species Hipparchia genava Fruhstorfer, 1907 (Switzerland)
Hipparchia aristaeus (Bonelli, 1826) – southern grayling – (North Africa, Asia Minor, southern Europe
Hipparchia algirica or Hipparchia aristaeus algirica (Oberthür, 1876)
Hipparchia aristaeus algirica (Oberthür, 1876) (Morocco, Algeria, Tunisia)
Hipparchia aristaeus aristaeus (Corsica, Sardinia)
Hipparchia aristaeus blachieri (Sicily)
Hipparchia autonoe (Esper, 1784) (southeastern Europe to northern Caucasus, southern Siberia, Amur, Korea, Tibet, northwestern China)
Hipparchia autonoe maxima Bang-Haas
Hipparchia autonoe orchomenus (Fruhstorfer, 1911) (Tibet)
Hipparchia autonoe sibirica (Staudinger, 1861) (Siberia)
Hipparchia autonoe wutaiensis Murayama
Hipparchia azorina (Strecker, 1899) – Azores grayling – (Azores)
Hipparchia caldeirensis (Oehmig (1981)
Hipparchia bacchus Higgins, 1967
Hipparchia blachieri (Frühstorfer, 1908)
Hipparchia christenseni Kudrna, 1977 (Greece)
Hipparchia cretica (Rebel, 1916) (Crete)
Hipparchia cypriensis (Holik, 1949) (Cyprus)
Hipparchia delattini Kudrna, 1975 (North Macedonia, northwestern Greece)
Hipparchia ellena (Oberthür, 1894) (North Africa)
Hipparchia ellena caroli (Rothschild, 1933) (Morocco)
Hipparchia fagi (Scopoli, 1763) – woodland grayling – (central Europe, southern Russia)
Hipparchia fagi tetrica Fruhstorfer, 1907
Hipparchia fatua (Freyer, 1844) – Freyer's grayling – (Asia Minor)
Hipparchia fatua klapperichi (Gross & Ebert, 1975)
Hipparchia fatua persiscana (Verity, 1937) (Armenia)
Hipparchia fidia (Linnaeus, 1767) – striped grayling – (North Africa, southwestern Europe)
Hipparchia fidia fidia
Hipparchia genava Fruhstorfer, 1907 – lesser rock grayling
Hipparchia gomera Higgins, 1967
Hipparchia hansii (Austaut, 1879) (North Africa)
Hipparchia hermione (Linnaeus, 1764) (central and southern Europe, North Africa, Asia Minor)
Hipparchia leighebi Kudrna, 1976 or Hipparchia semele leighebi Kudrna, 1976 Sicily
Hipparchia maderensis (Bethune-Baker, 1891) – Madeiran grayling – (Madeira)
Hipparchia mersina (Staudinger, 1871) (Greece)
Hipparchia miguelensis Le Cerf, 1935
Hipparchia neapolitana (Stauder, 1921) – Italian grayling – (Italy)
Hipparchia neomiris (Godart, 1824) – Corsican grayling – (Corsica, Sardinia)
Hipparchia parisatis (Kollar, 1849) – white-edged rock brown – (Asia)
Hipparchia parisatis laeta (Christoph, 1877)
Hipparchia parisatis macrophthalma Eversmann, 1851 (Armenia)
Hipparchia parisatis xizangensis (Chou, 1994) (Tibet)
Hipparchia pellucida (Stauder, 1924) or Hipparchia semele pellucida (Asia Minor, southeastern Europe)
Hipparchia pisidice (Klug, 1832) (Syria, Lebanon)
Hipparchia powelli (Oberthür, 1910) (Algeria)
Hipparchia sbordonii Kudrna, 1984 or Hipparchia semele sbordonii Kudrna, 1984 – Ponza grayling – (Pontine Islands)
Hipparchia semele (Linnaeus, 1758) – grayling – (Europe, southern Russia)
Hipparchia semele semele (Europe)
Hipparchia semele atlantica (northwestern Scotland) 
Hipparchia semele cadmus Fruhstorfer, 1908 (mountains of Europe)
Hipparchia semele clarensis (Ireland)
Hipparchia semele hibernica (Ireland)
Hipparchia semele leighebi Kudrna, 1976 or Hipparchia leighebi (Sicily)
Hipparchia semele pellucida (Stauder, 1924)
Hipparchia semele sbordonii Kudrna, 1984 (Pontine Islands)
Hipparchia semele scota (coasts of Scotland)
Hipparchia semele thyone
Hipparchia senthes (Fruhstorfer, 1908) or Hipparchia aristaeus senthes (Albania, North Macedonia, Bulgaria, Greece, Turkey)
Hipparchia statilinus (Hufnagel, 1766) – tree grayling – (North Africa, Asia Minor southern and central Europe)
Hipparchia statilinus statilinus
Hipparchia statilinus sylvicola (Austaut, 1880) (North Africa)
Hipparchia stulta (Staudinger, 1882) (Turkmenistan, Uzbekistan, Tadjikistan, Afghanistan)
Hipparchia syriaca (Staudinger, 1871) (southeastern Europe, Turkey)
Hipparchia tewfiki (Wiltshire, 1949)
Hipparchia tilosi (Manil, 1984)
Hipparchia volgensis (Mazochin-Porshnjakov, 1952) (Asia Minor, southeastern Europe) 
Hipparchia wyssii (Christoph, 1889) (Canary Islands)

References

External links
Satyrinae of the Western Palearctic
 With images.

 
Satyrini
Butterfly genera
Taxa named by Johan Christian Fabricius